Boubekeur Belbekri (born 7 January 1942) was a professional Algerian footballer who played as a defender.

Life and career
Belbekri played his whole career with the USM Alger for 11 years, during which he won a single title in 1963 and five consecutive times to the final of the Algerian Cup and although there is no official number but he is one of the most players played games with the USM Alger more of 350 matches.

International
Belbekri played only four games with the national team first against Bulgaria in the first official game in the history of Algeria and participated as a substitute.

Honours

Club
 USM Alger
 Championnat National (1): 1962-63
 Algerian Cup Runner-up (5): 1968-69, 1969-70, 1970-71, 1971-72, 1972-73

References

External links
Profile on usm-alger.com site
 

1942 births
Algerian footballers
Algeria international footballers
1968 African Cup of Nations players
Footballers from Algiers
USM Alger players
Living people
Association football defenders
21st-century Algerian people